Gorki is a rural locality (a village) in Komarichsky District, Bryansk Oblast, Russia. The population was 6 as of 2010. There is 1 street.

Geography 
Gorki is located 31 km west of Komarichi (the district's administrative centre) by road. Bobrik is the nearest rural locality.

References 

Rural localities in Komarichsky District